Hyderya Sports FC, also known as Hyderya Kashmir Football Club (HKFC), is an Indian football club based in Srinagar, Jammu and Kashmir, that competes in the JKFA Professional League, and was nominated for I-League Qualifiers. Nicknamed as Mountain Lions, Hyderya was to be the third club from Jammu and Kashmir to participate in qualifiers.

History
Hyderya FC participated in the first ever JKFA Professional League, where they finished runners up, earning qualification spot for 2021 I-League Qualifiers. On 27 September 2021, the All India Football Federation disqualified Hyderya from the I-League Qualifiers, for producing a bank guarantee which was "not genuine".

Honours

Domestic league
JKFA Professional League
Runners-up (1): 2021

See also
List of football clubs in Jammu & Kashmir

References

Association football clubs established in 2006
I-League 2nd Division clubs
2006 establishments in Jammu and Kashmir
Sport in Srinagar
Football clubs in Jammu and Kashmir